The 1950 Los Angeles Rams season was the team's 13th year with the National Football League and the fifth season in Los Angeles.

The 1950 Rams hold the NFL's all-time record for average points per game, scoring 38.8 points per contest.  They also hold the record for most points in a three-game span, with 165 points between October 15 and 29. They are the only team in modern NFL history to score 60-or-more points twice in a season. They did so in consecutive games, in Weeks Six (70) and Seven (65).

Los Angeles's 466 points scored in 1950 are the most scored by any team in the 1950s, and more than 70 points more than the next-closest team (which is, incidentally, the 1951 Rams).

Before the season

Draft

Regular season

Schedule

Standings

Playoffs

References

Los Angeles Rams
Los Angeles Rams seasons
Los Angeles